Jean-Baptiste Estoup (16 January 1868, in Navenne – 17 April 1950, in Paris) was a French stenographer and writer on stenography.

Estoup was General Secretary of the Institut Sténographique de France. In his Gammes sténographiques (3d ed. 1912), he pioneered the investigation of the regularity later known as Zipf's law.

References

1868 births
1950 deaths
Shorthand systems
French male writers